Events in the year 1855 in Iceland.

Incumbents 

 Monarch: Frederick VII of Denmark
 Council President of Denmark: Peter Georg Bang

Events 

 The Icelandic Army was re-established by Andreas August von Kohl, the sheriff in Vestmannaeyjar.

Births 

 6 June − Þorvaldur Thoroddsen, geologist and geographer.
 2 December − Þórhallur Bjarnarson, politician.

Deaths 

 Rósa Guðmundsdóttir, poet.

References 

 
1850s in Iceland
Years of the 19th century in Iceland
Iceland
Iceland